Enter the Fat Dragon is a 1978 Hong Kong martial arts film starring and directed by Sammo Hung. The film is mostly a parody of the Bruce Lee film Way of the Dragon (1972), and a satire of the Bruceploitation phenomenon of the 1970s. The title is a reference to another Bruce Lee film, Enter the Dragon (1973).

The film had a belated video release in the United States, eventually coming out in 1999 after director and actor Sammo Hung became an unexpected success with his American TV series Martial Law.

In November 2017, it was announced that Donnie Yen would star in a remake of the film, directed by Kenji Tanigaki and Aman Chang. The remake was released in 2020.

Plot
Ah Lung is a pig farmer and a devoted Bruce Lee fan who is anxious to follow in Lee's footsteps, but only ridiculed for his attempts because of his weight. He is sent to the city to earn a living working at his uncle's restaurant, but when he arrives, he finds a gang of thugs causing trouble in the restaurant. He takes the chance to prove himself and attacks the thugs, defeating them and saving the restaurant. Soon, he becomes a waiter, and discovers a plot by the same thugs to kidnap a woman he works with. Eventually, he defeats the thugs once again and saves the day.

Cast

Home video releases
In 1999, Crash Cinema released Enter the Fat Dragon on DVD in the US in a non-anamorphic widescreen transfer from a battered 35mm release print with burned-in English subtitles. The print Crash Cinema used was missing around three minutes of footage from the final fight scenes.

In 2019, Thunderfist Productions released a newly restored version of it on Blu-ray and DVD in Germany under the title "Der kleine Dicke mit dem Superschlag" (The Little Fat One with the Super Punch). Four different "mediabook" Blu-ray/DVD combo designs and a standard Blu-ray were issued.  Three different cuts of the film are included: the restored international export theatrical version, the reconstructed full-length Hong Kong theatrical version, and the German theatrical version. The restored export version is the main presentation and contains the fight footage missing from the Crash Cinema DVD, but is missing the comedic bus horse race radio broadcast scene near the beginning and a couple of other comedy bits from later on in the film. This version runs 91 minutes and features the original Cantonese mono soundtrack as well as the original English and German dubs, plus English subtitles. The reconstructed full-length Hong Kong version takes the missing comedy bits and the original Chinese opening credits sequence from the Crash Cinema DVD and drops them into the restored export cut. This version runs 96 minutes and features the original Cantonese mono soundtrack with removable English subtitles for the bulk of the film and burned-in subtitles for the bits that had to be sourced from the Crash DVD. The German theatrical version is cut down from the restored export version to match the original German theatrical release, runs 82 minutes, and features the German dub only. Extras include the original Hong Kong trailer in Cantonese with English subtitles, the original international trailer dubbed in German, a photo gallery of German posters and lobby cards, and a commentary track for the main export version by the Podcast On Fire crew (Stewart Sutherland, Mike Leeder, and Kenneth Brorsson). Mediabook editions include a booklet with photos and German text.

See also

List of Hong Kong films
Sammo Hung filmography
Kung Fu Panda (2008)

References

External links

 
 
 Enter the Fat Dragon at Kungfucinema.com
 Enter the Fat Dragon Audio Commentary at PodcastOnFire.com

1978 films
1978 martial arts films
1970s martial arts comedy films
1970s parody films
1970s Cantonese-language films
Bruceploitation films
Films directed by Sammo Hung
Films set in Hong Kong
Hong Kong martial arts comedy films
Hong Kong slapstick comedy films
Kung fu films
1980s Hong Kong films
1970s Hong Kong films